Statistics of Meistaradeildin in the 1963 season.

Overview
It was contested by 4 teams, and Havnar Bóltfelag won the championship.

League table

Results

References
RSSSF

Meistaradeildin seasons
Faroe
Faroe